Kherreh (also Romanized as Kharreh) is a village in Nayband Rural District, Chah-e Mobarak District, Asaluyeh County, Bushehr Province, Iran. At the 2006 census, its population was 480, in 67 families.

References 

Populated places in Asaluyeh County